The crested lark (Galerida cristata) is a species of lark widespread across Eurasia and northern Africa. It is a non-migratory bird, but can occasionally be found as a vagrant in Great Britain.

Taxonomy and systematics
The crested lark was one of the many species originally described by Carl Linnaeus in his landmark 1758 10th edition of Systema Naturae. It was classified in the genus Alauda until German naturalist Friedrich Boie placed it in the new genus Galerida in 1821. Colin Harrison recommended lumping members of Galerida and Lullula back into Alauda in 1865 due to a lack of defining characteristics. The current scientific name is derived from Latin. Galerida was the name for a lark with a crest, from galerum, "cap", and cristata means "crested". Alban Guillaumet and colleagues noted the distinctiveness of populations from the Maghreb - birds in the dryer parts of Morocco and Tunisia had longer bills while those in more coastal northern parts had shorter bills typical of the European subspecies. The authors sampled the mitochondrial DNA and found they were distinct genetically.

Formerly, the Maghreb lark was considered as a subspecies of the crested lark.

Subspecies 
Thirty-three subspecies are recognized:
 Iberian crested lark (G. c. pallida) - Brehm, CL, 1858: Found in Portugal and Spain
 Central European crested lark (G. c. cristata) - Linnaeus, 1758: Found from southern Scandinavia and France east to Ukraine and Hungary
 West Italian crested lark (G. c. neumanni) - Hilgert, 1907: Found in west-central Italy
 Greecian crested lark (G. c. meridionalis) - Brehm, CL, 1841: Originally described as a separate species. Found from eastern Croatia to central Greece and western Turkey
 Cyprus crested lark (G. c. cypriaca) - Bianchi, 1907: Found on Rhodes, Karpathos and Cyprus
 South-east European crested lark (G. c. tenuirostris) - Brehm, CL, 1858: Found from eastern Hungary and Romania to southern Russia and Kazakhstan
 Caucasian crested lark (G. c. caucasica) - Taczanowski, 1888: Found on eastern Aegean islands, northern Turkey and southern Caucasus
 North-west Moroccan crested lark (G. c. kleinschmidti) - Erlanger, 1899: Found in north-western Morocco
 West Moroccan crested lark (G. c. riggenbachi) - Hartert, 1902: Found in western Morocco
 North Algerian crested lark (G. c. carthaginis) - Kleinschmidt, O & Hilgert, 1905: Found from north-eastern Morocco to northern Tunisia
 North-east Algerian crested lark (G. c. arenicola) - Tristram, 1859: Originally described as a separate species. Found in north-eastern Algeria, southern Tunisia and north-western Libya
 Cyrenaica crested lark (G. c. festae) - Hartert, 1922: Found in coastal north-eastern Libya
 North-east Libyan crested lark (G. c. brachyura) - Tristram, 1865: Found from inland north-eastern Libya to southern Iraq and northern Arabia
 South-east Algerian crested lark (G. c. helenae) - Lavauden, 1926: Found in south-eastern Algeria and south-western Libya
 G. c. jordansi - Niethammer, 1955: Found in the Aïr Mountains (northern Niger)
 Nile Delta crested lark (G. c. nigricans) - Brehm, CL, 1855: Originally described as a separate species. Found in the Nile Delta (northern Egypt)
 Northern Nile Valley crested lark (G. c. maculata) - Brehm, CL, 1858: Found in central Egypt
 Southern Nile Valley crested lark (G. c. halfae) - Nicoll, 1921: Found in southern Egypt and northern Sudan
 Dongola crested lark (G. c. altirostris) - Brehm, CL, 1855: Originally described as a separate species. Found in eastern Sudan and Eritrea
 Somali crested lark (G. c. somaliensis) - Reichenow, 1907: Found in southern Ethiopia, northern Somalia and northern Kenya
 G. c. balsaci - Dekeyser & Villiers, 1950: Found in coastal Mauritania
 Senegal crested lark (G. c. senegallensis) - (Statius Müller, PL, 1776): Originally described as a separate species in the genus Alauda. Found from Mauritania and Senegal to Niger
 Nigerian crested lark (G. c. alexanderi) - Neumann, 1908: Found from northern Nigeria to western Sudan and north-eastern Central African Republic
 Sudan crested lark (G. c. isabellina) - Bonaparte, 1850: Originally described as a separate species. Found in central Sudan
 Coastal Levant crested lark (G. c. cinnamomina) - Hartert, 1904: Found in western Lebanon and north-western Israel
 East Levant crested lark (G. c. zion) - Meinertzhagen, R, 1920: Found from southern Turkey to north-eastern Israel
 Central Turkey crested lark (G. c. subtaurica) - (Kollibay, 1912): Found from central Turkey to south-western Turkmenistan and northern Iran
 Kazakhstan crested lark or Baluchistan crested lark (G. c. magna) - Hume, 1871: Originally described as a separate species. Found from central Iran and central Turkmenistan to north-western Pakistan, Kazakhstan, southern Mongolia and north-western China
 G. c. leautungensis - (R. Swinhoe, 1861): Originally described as a separate species in the genus Alauda. Found in north-eastern and eastern China
 G. c. coreensis - Taczanowski, 1888: Found in Korea
 Gilgit crested lark (G. c. lynesi) - Whistler, 1928: Found in northern Pakistan
 Indian crested lark (G. c. chendoola) - (Franklin, 1831): Originally described as a separate species in the genus Alauda. Found from central and eastern Pakistan through western and northern India to southern Nepal

Description
It is a small, brown bird which has a short tail with light brown outer feathers. Male and females have no real differences, but young crested larks have more spots on their back than their older counterparts. Its plumage is downy but sparse and appears whitish. The distinct crest from which the crested lark gets its name is conspicuous at all times but is more pronounced during territorial or courtship displays and when singing. In flight it shows reddish underwings. It shares many characteristics with the Thekla lark, with the main distinctions between the two being the beak, the Thekla's heavier black-brown streaks and its grey underwing, present in European specimens.

Distribution and habitat

The crested lark breeds across most of temperate Eurasia from Portugal to north-eastern China and eastern India, and in Africa south to Niger. It is non-migratory, and the sedentary nature of this species is illustrated by the fact that it is only a very rare vagrant to Great Britain, despite breeding as close as northern France. While the bird is not commonly found in Scandinavia today, it could be found in Sweden until the 1990s, with sources reporting six individual birds in 1992 before becoming extirpated in Sweden in 1993. The birds have also been extirpated in several other European countries, including Norway (1972), Luxembourg (1973) and Switzerland (1980s).

This is a common bird of dry, open country and is often seen by roadsides or in cereal fields, although it is also found occupying small, sandy patches by railways, docks and airfields.

Behaviour

The related Eurasian skylark exhibits similar behaviour but also sings during its ascent, whereas the crested lark sings either at altitude or on the ground. Their flight pattern is an example of undulatory locomotion.

Breeding

It nests in small depressions in the ground, often in wastelands and on the outskirts of towns. The nests are untidy structures composed primarily of dead grasses and roots. Three to five brown, finely speckled eggs, similar to those of the Eurasian skylark, are laid at a time and will hatch after .  As with most larks, the chicks leave the nest early, after about eight days and take flight after reaching  old. Two broods will usually be raised each year.

Food and feeding

Largely vegetarian birds, the crested lark primarily feeds on grains and seeds, such as oats, wheat and barley, but will also eat insects, particularly beetles, with food either being scavenged from the ground or dug up. Juvenile birds are fed by both parents, and generally leave the nest before they are able to fly to start foraging for food themselves.

Relationship to humans
Francis of Assisi considered the crested lark a bird of special significance, based on similarities he perceived between it and the life of the Friars Minor: its plain earth-coloured plumage and hood, its humility ("for it goes willingly along the wayside and finds a grain of corn for itself"), and its time spent in song.

Status
The crested lark has been categorised by the IUCN Red List of Threatened Species as being of least concern, meaning that it is not currently threatened with extinction. Estimates for the global population of mature individuals of the species range from 22,000,000 to 91,200,000. Figures for Europe are less varied, with estimates putting the number of breeding pairs at between 3,600,000 and 7,600,000, or between 7,200,000 and 15,200,000 individuals. In Europe, trends since 1982 have shown an overall decline in the population of the species, resulting in the assumption that the crested lark is in decline globally.

References

crested lark
Birds of Eurasia
Birds of North Africa
Birds described in 1758
Taxa named by Carl Linnaeus
Articles containing video clips